Gordon High School can refer to:

Gordon High School (Georgia) in Decatur, Georgia
Gordon High School (Texas) in Gordon, Texas
Gordon High School (Nebraska) in Gordon, Nebraska
Gordon Central High School, Calhoun, Georgia
Gordon Junior High School (former name of Rose L. Hardy Middle School) in Washington, DC